Hayat Lambarki (born 18 May 1988 in Safi) is a Moroccan track and field athlete specializing in the 400 metres hurdles.

She competed in the 2012 Summer Olympics where she got to the semifinals. Her personal best in the event is 55.27 achieved in 2013 in Mersin.

International competitions

References
 
 
 London 2012 bio

External links
 
 
 

1988 births
Living people
People from Salé
Moroccan female hurdlers
Olympic athletes of Morocco
Athletes (track and field) at the 2012 Summer Olympics
World Athletics Championships athletes for Morocco
Athletes (track and field) at the 2016 Summer Olympics
Mediterranean Games gold medalists for Morocco
Athletes (track and field) at the 2013 Mediterranean Games
Mediterranean Games medalists in athletics
Islamic Solidarity Games competitors for Morocco
Islamic Solidarity Games medalists in athletics
20th-century Moroccan women
21st-century Moroccan women